Joseph Bennett (1835 – 28 January 1879) was a New Zealand cricketer. He played in one first-class match for Canterbury in 1863/64.

See also
 List of Canterbury representative cricketers

References

External links
 

1835 births
1879 deaths
New Zealand cricketers
Canterbury cricketers
Cricketers from Christchurch